Hassan Khalilabadi is an Iranian teacher and reformist politician. He currently serves as an alternative member in the City Council of Tehran and is elected for a seat in the upcoming term of the council.

He is also the official spokesperson for the Islamic Association of Teachers of Iran.

References

Living people
Iranian educators
Islamic Association of Teachers of Iran politicians
Tehran Councillors 2017–
Year of birth missing (living people)